Romuald Paszkiewicz (7 July 1941 – 25 August 2003) was a Polish volleyball player. He competed in the men's tournament at the 1968 Summer Olympics.

References

External links
 

1941 births
2003 deaths
Sportspeople from Vilnius
Polish men's volleyball players
Olympic volleyball players of Poland
Volleyball players at the 1968 Summer Olympics
Legia Warsaw (volleyball) players